Lethal Hostage (边境风云) is 2012 Chinese crime thriller film set on the Chinese-Burmese border.

Plot 
The film is about the relationship between Hong, a drug dealer, and Annie, his hostage. 10 years ago Annie's father was a dentist who worked with drug dealing gangsters however their plan went wrong when a mob boss was killed by police. His henchman Hong kidnapped ten-year-old Annie to Burma where he raised her as his daughter. Years later they ended up becoming lovers due to Stockholm syndrome. Before they could be married Hong faces one last job.

Cast 
Sun Honglei
Wang Luodan
Ni Da-hong
Zhang Mo
Yang Kun

References

External links 
 

2012 films
Chinese crime thriller films
Films about kidnapping
Films directed by Cheng Er